Latvia participated in the Eurovision Song Contest 2015 with the song "Love Injected" written and performed by Aminata. The Latvian broadcaster Latvijas Televīzija (LTV) organised the national final Supernova 2015 in order to select the Latvian entry for the 2015 contest in Vienna, Austria. Twenty songs were selected to compete in the national final, which consisted of four shows: two heats, one semi-final and a final. In the heats and the semi-final, four entries were selected to advance from each show: two entries selected based on a public televote and two entries selected by a four-member jury panel. Four songs ultimately qualified to compete in the final on 22 February 2015 where a public vote exclusively selected "Love Injected" performed by Aminata as the winner.

Latvia was drawn to compete in the second semi-final of the Eurovision Song Contest which took place on 21 May 2015. Performing during the show in position 10, "Love Injected" was announced among the top 10 entries of the second semi-final and therefore qualified to compete in the final on 23 May. It was later revealed that Latvia placed second out of the 17 participating countries in the semi-final with 155 points. In the final, Latvia performed in position 19 and placed sixth out of the 27 participating countries, scoring 186 points. This was Latvia's best placing in the contest since 2005.

Background 

Prior to the 2015 contest, Latvia had participated in the Eurovision Song Contest fifteen times since its first entry in 2000. Latvia won the contest once in 2002 with the song "I Wanna" performed by Marie N. Following the introduction of semi-finals for the 2004, Latvia was able to qualify to compete in the final between 2005 and 2008. Between 2009 and 2014, the nation had failed to qualify to the final for six consecutive years including with their 2014 entry "Cake to Bake" performed by Aarzemnieki.

The Latvian national broadcaster, Latvijas Televīzija (LTV), broadcasts the event within Latvia and organises the selection process for the nation's entry. LTV confirmed their intentions to participate at the 2015 Eurovision Song Contest on 8 September 2014. Latvia has selected their entries for the Eurovision Song Contest through a national final. Since their debut in 2000 until 2012, LTV had organised the selection show Eirodziesma. In a response to the nation's failure to qualify to the final at Eurovision since 2008, between 2013 and 2014, the competition was rebranded and retooled as Dziesma. After failing to produce successful entries those two years, LTV announced that it would be organising a new national final titled Supernova in order to select the Latvian entry for the 2015 contest. LTV outlined that the goal of the competition is to find a song that has international hit potential and an artist that is charismatic, talented and capable of performing the selected song.

Before Eurovision

Supernova 2015 
Supernova 2015 was the first edition of Supernova, the music competition that selects Latvia's entries for the Eurovision Song Contest. The competition commenced on 1 February 2015 and concluded with a final on 22 February 2015. All shows in the competition took place at the LTV Studio 6 in Riga, hosted by Ketija Šēnberga and Toms Grēviņš and broadcast on LTV1 as well as online via the official Supernova website supernova.lsm.lv. An alternative broadcast of the final also occurred online at lsm.lv with commentary by the duo Transleiteris consisting of Edžus Ķaukulis and Lauris Mihailovs.

Format
The format of the competition consisted of four shows: two heats, one semi-final and a final. LTV broadcast two introductory shows on 18 and 25 January 2015 that covered the background preparation processes and performer auditions that occurred prior to the competition. The two heats, held on 1 and 8 February 2015, each featured ten competing entries from which four advanced to the semi-final from each show. The semi-final, held on 15 February 2015, featured the eight qualifiers from the heats from which four proceeded to the final. The final, held on 22 February 2015, selected the Latvian entry for Vienna from the remaining four entries.

Results during the heats and the semi-final shows were determined by a jury panel and votes from the public. In the heats and the semi-final, the songs first faced a public vote where the top two entries qualified. The jury then selected an additional two qualifiers from the remaining entries to proceed in the competition. In the final, a public vote exclusively determined which entry would be the winner. Viewers were able to vote via telephone up to five times or via SMS with a single SMS counting as five votes. The online vote conducted through the official Supernova website allowed users to vote once per each accepted social network account: Draugiem.lv, Facebook and Twitter. During the competition, the jury panel also had the right to reinstate an eliminated song if they believed the song had potential with an artist that was still active in the competition. Should this have occurred, the jury would replace a competing artist's song with the eliminated song.

The jury participated in each show by providing feedback to the competing artists and selecting entries to advance in the competition. The panel consists of:
Kaspars Roga – drummer for Brainstorm and director of music videos
Guntars Račs – musician, songwriter, producer and music publisher
Dons – singer-songwriter
Ieva Kerēvica – singer and vocal teacher

Competing entries
Artists and songwriters were able to submit their applications and entries separately to the broadcaster between 3 November 2014 and 10 December 2014. 98 songs were submitted and 123 performers applied for the competition at the conclusion of the submission period. Local and international jury panels were appointed by LTV for the selection process; the international jury panel conducted the song selection from the submitted songs while the local jury panel screened and selected the performers. The international jury panel consisted of Peo Nylén (producer and representative of Scandinavian Songs AB record company), Michael Jay (producer and songwriter) and Jarkko Nordlund (Universal Music Group Finland and the Baltic region manager). The local jury panel consisted of the four-member jury panel during the live shows: Kaspars Roga, Guntars Račs, Dons and Ieva Kerēvica. The performer auditions took place on 5 January 2015 and featured 56 shortlisted performers from the initial 123 that had applied. The twenty competing artists and songs were announced during a press conference on 13 January 2015.

Shows

Heats 
The two heats took place on 1 and 8 February 2015. In each heat ten acts competed and four entries qualified to the semi-final. The competing entries first faced a public vote where the top two songs advanced; an additional two qualifiers were then selected from the remaining eight entries by the jury.

Semi-final 
The semi-final took place on 15 February 2015. 2009 Latvian Eurovision entrant Intars Busulis was a guest juror for the semi-final, filling in for Dons. Four entries qualified to the final. The eight competing entries first faced a public vote where the top two songs advanced. An additional two qualifiers were selected from the remaining six entries by the jury.

Final 
The final took place on 22 February 2015. The four entries that qualified from the semi-final competed. The song with the highest number of votes from the public, "Love Injected" performed by Aminata, was declared the winner. In addition to the performances of the competing entries, guest performers included the band bet bet, singer Dons and 2000 Latvian Eurovision entrant Brainstorm.

Promotion 
Aminata made several appearances across Europe to specifically promote "Love Injected" as the Latvian Eurovision entry. On 18 April, Aminata performed during the Eurovision in Concert event which was held at the Melkweg venue in Amsterdam, Netherlands and hosted by Cornald Maas and Edsilia Rombley. On 26 April, Aminata performed during the London Eurovision Party, which was held at the Café de Paris venue in London, United Kingdom and hosted by Nicki French and Paddy O'Connell. In addition to her international appearances, Aminata performed during the Eurovision PreParty Riga, which was organised by OGAE Latvia and held at the Palladium Concert Hall in Riga on 17 April.

At Eurovision 

According to Eurovision rules, all nations with the exceptions of the host country and the "Big Five" (France, Germany, Italy, Spain and the United Kingdom) are required to qualify from one of two semi-finals in order to compete for the final; the top ten countries from each semi-final progress to the final. In the 2015 contest, Australia also competed directly in the final as an invited guest nation. The European Broadcasting Union (EBU) split up the competing countries into five different pots based on voting patterns from previous contests, with countries with favourable voting histories put into the same pot. On 26 January 2015, a special allocation draw was held which placed each country into one of the two semi-finals, as well as which half of the show they would perform in. Latvia was placed into the second semi-final, to be held on 21 May 2015, and was scheduled to perform in the second half of the show.

Once all the competing songs for the 2015 contest had been released, the running order for the semi-finals was decided by the shows' producers rather than through another draw, so that similar songs were not placed next to each other. Latvia was set to perform in position 10, following the entry from Israel and before the entry from Azerbaijan.

The two semi-finals and the final were broadcast in Latvia on LTV1 with all shows featuring commentary by Valters Frīdenbergs who was joined by Toms Grēviņš for the final. The Latvian spokesperson, who announced the Latvian votes during the final, was Markus Riva.

Semi-final

Aminata took part in technical rehearsals on 14 and 16 May, followed by dress rehearsals on 20 and 21 May. This included the jury show on 20 May where the professional juries of each country watched and voted on the competing entries.

The Latvian performance featured Aminata in a long red dress and black jewellery standing on a pedestal at the centre of the stage. Special tattoos were applied to Aminata's body for effect. Red and white lighting was used in addition to fast camera shot cuts that showed wide angles, top shots and close shots. The LED screens displayed cathedral-like windows along with moving rays and white strobe lights. Aminata was joined by three backing vocalists: Līva Zariņa, Katrīna Anna Vīgante and Anna Zankovska.

At the end of the show, Latvia was announced as having finished in the top ten and subsequently qualifying for the grand final. It was later revealed that the Latvia placed second in the semi-final, receiving a total of 155 points. This was the first time in six years that Latvia had managed to qualify to the Eurovision final; their last appearance in a final was in 2008.

Final
Shortly after the second semi-final, a winner's press conference was held for the ten qualifying countries. As part of this press conference, the qualifying artists took part in a draw to determine which half of the grand final they would subsequently participate in. This draw was done in the order the countries were announced during the semi-final. Latvia was drawn to compete in the second half. Following this draw, the shows' producers decided upon the running order of the final, as they had done for the semi-finals. Latvia was subsequently placed to perform in position 19, following the entry from Poland and before the entry from Romania.

Aminata once again took part in dress rehearsals on 22 and 23 May before the final, including the jury final where the professional juries cast their final votes before the live show. Aminata performed a repeat of her semi-final performance during the final on 23 May. At the conclusion of the voting, Latvia placed sixth with 186 points. Latvia received 12 points, the maximum number of points a country can give to another country, from three countries. This result was Latvia's best since they placed fifth in 2005 with the song "The War Is Not Over" performed by Walters and Kazha.

Voting
Voting during the three shows consisted of 50 percent public televoting and 50 percent from a jury deliberation. The jury consisted of five music industry professionals who were citizens of the country they represent, with their names published before the contest to ensure transparency. This jury was asked to judge each contestant based on: vocal capacity; the stage performance; the song's composition and originality; and the overall impression by the act. In addition, no member of a national jury could be related in any way to any of the competing acts in such a way that they cannot vote impartially and independently. The individual rankings of each jury member were released shortly after the grand final.

Following the release of the full split voting by the EBU after the conclusion of the competition, it was revealed that Latvia had placed eighth with the public televote and second with the jury vote in the final. In the public vote, Latvia scored 100 points finishing in tenth place, while in the jury vote, Latvia placed second with 249 points. In the second semi-final, Latvia placed third with the public televote receiving 116 points and second with the jury vote with 155 points.

Below is a breakdown of points awarded to Latvia and awarded by Latvia in the second semi-final and grand final of the contest, and the breakdown of the jury voting and televoting conducted during the two shows:

Points awarded to Latvia

Points awarded by Latvia

Detailed voting results
The following members comprised the Latvian jury:
 Kristaps Krievkalns (jury chairperson)composer, producer
 Beāte Zviedresinger
 Ralfs Eilandssinger, composer, represented Latvia in the 2013 contest as part of PeR
 DJ, presenter
 Ilona Jahimovičajournalist, producer

References 

2015
Countries in the Eurovision Song Contest 2015
Eurovision